Pierre-Jules Renard (22 February 1864 – 22 May 1910) was a French author and member of the Académie Goncourt, most famous for the works Poil de carotte (Carrot Top, 1894) and Les Histoires Naturelles (Nature Stories, 1896). Among his other works are Le Plaisir de rompre (The Pleasure of Breaking, 1898) and the posthumously published Huit Jours à la campagne (A Week in the Country, 1912).

Early life
The child of François Renard and Anna-Rose Colin, Renard was born in Châlons-du-Maine, Mayenne where his father was working on the construction of a railroad. Renard grew up in Chitry-les-Mines, (Nièvre). He had three older siblings, including Amélie (born 1858), who died at a young age. A second sister was also named Amélie (born 1859). A third child, Maurice, was born before Pierre-Jules in 1862. Renard's childhood was characterized as difficult and sad (un grand silence roux or "a great ruddy silence"). Although he decided not to attend the prestigious École normale supérieure, love of literature would eventually dominate his life. From 1885 to 86, he served in the military in Bourges.

Life and career
On 28 April 1888, Renard married Marie Morneau. He and his wife lived at 43 rue du Rocher in the 8th Arrondissement of Paris. He began to frequent literary cafés and to contribute to Parisian newspapers. Among his steady friends were Alfred Capus and Lucien Guitry. Jules Renard wrote poems, short stories, short plays, novels and his famous Poil de carotte. He was elected mayor (maire) of Chitry les mines (58) on 15 May 1904 as the socialist candidate and became a member of the Académie Goncourt in 1907, thanks to Octave Mirbeau. He died of arteriosclerosis in Paris.

Work

Some of Jules Renard's works take their inspiration from the countryside he loved in the Nièvre region. His character portraits are sharp, ironic and sometimes cruel (in his Histoires naturelles he humanizes animals and animalizes men) and he was an active supporter of pacifism and anticlericalism (apparent in La Bigote).

His Journal, 1887–1910 (published in 1925) is a masterpiece of introspection, irony, humor and nostalgia, and provides an important glimpse into the literary life.

The English writer Somerset Maugham was influenced to publish his own well-known journals by the example of Renard. In the introduction to his own work A Writer's Notebook, Maugham wrote an apt summary of the virtues of Renard's journal: "The journal is wonderfully good reading. It is extremely amusing. It is witty and subtle and often wise...Jules Renard jotted down neat retorts and clever phrases, epigrams, things seen, the sayings of people and the look of them, descriptions of scenery, effects of sunshine and shadow, everything, in short, that could be of use to him when he sat down to write for publication."

The American novelist Gilbert Sorrentino based his 1994 work Red the Fiend on Renard's Poil de carotte. For a great part, the 2008 memoir Nothing to Be Frightened Of by the English novelist Julian Barnes is a homage to Jules Renard.

Renard is one of several popular philosophers whose quotations appear on the road signs of Project HIMANK in the Ladakh region of northern India. On one such sign in the Nubra Valley, he is quoted as saying, "Laziness is nothing more than the habit of resting before you get tired".

Works

Novels
Crime de village (1888)
Sourires pincés (1890)
L'Écornifleur (1892)
La Lanterne sourde (1893)
Coquecigrues (1893)
Deux Fables sans morale (1893)
Le Coureur de filles (1894)
Histoires naturelles (1894)
Poil de carotte (1894), text
Le Vigneron dans sa vigne (1894)
La Maîtresse (1896)
Bucoliques (1898)
Les Philippe (1907)
Patrie (1907)
Mots d'écrit (1908)
Ragotte (1909)
Nos Frères farouches (1909)
Causeries (1910)
L'Œil clair (1913)
Les Cloportes (1919)

Plays
La Demande (1895)
Le Plaisir de rompre (1897)
Le Pain de ménage (1898)
Poil de carotte (1900)
Monsieur Vernet (1903)
La Bigote (1909)
Huit Jours à la campagne (1912)

Non-fiction
Journal, 1887–1910 (1925), text
Writing lessons, published by Ringer (2008)

Bibliophilia
The Écornifleur (1892), original etchings by Jacques Boullaire, Les Bibliophiles de France, Paris (1955)
Philippe (1907), original lithographs by André Minaux, Les Bibliophiles Franks, Paris (1958)

Quotes

It is not how old you are but how you are old.
If you are afraid of being lonely, don't try to be right.
Writing is an occupation in which you have to keep proving your talent to people who have none.
Culture is what's left after you have forgotten everything.
I don't know if God exists, but it would be better for His reputation if He didn't.
Look for the ridiculous in everything, and you will find it.
If money does not make you happy; give it back.
Writing is the only way to talk without being interrupted.
If one were to build the house of happiness, the largest space would be the waiting room.
Dying serves no purpose so die now.
The horse is the only animal into which one can bang nails.
We don't understand life any better at forty than at twenty, but we know it and admit it.
I find when I do not think of myself I do not think at all.
Failure is not the only punishment for laziness; there is also the success of others.
Laziness is nothing more than the habit of resting before you get tired.
The only man who is really free is the one who can turn down an invitation to dinner without giving an excuse.
Writing is the only profession where no one considers you ridiculous if you earn no money.
As I grow to understand life less and less, I learn to love it more and more.
I am never bored anywhere; being bored is an insult to oneself.
If I were to begin life again, I should want it as it was. I would only open my eyes a little more.
Love is like an hourglass, with the heart filling up as the brain empties.
Not everybody can be an orphan.

See also
Le Monde's 100 Books of the Century, a list which includes the Journal

References

External links

Jules Renard on Encyclopædia Britannica
 Jules Renard Biography and Bibliography
 Jules Renard Biography

Jules Renard Quotes - The Quotations Page at www.quotationspage.com
The Journal of Jules Renard at Tin House
 Pour Jules Renard: Biography, quotes and many links
 Amoureux de Jules Renard: Daily Diary and quotes

1864 births
1910 deaths
People from Mayenne
19th-century French novelists
20th-century French novelists
19th-century French dramatists and playwrights
French male novelists
20th-century French dramatists and playwrights
French male short story writers
19th-century French short story writers
19th-century French male writers
20th-century French short story writers
20th-century French male writers
Anti-clericals